Scott Griekspoor (born 10 January 1991) is a Dutch retired tennis player.

Griekspoor has a career high ATP singles ranking of No. 205 achieved on 6 August 2018. He also has a career high doubles ranking of No. 419 achieved on 29 September 2014.

Griekspoor has won 1 ATP Challenger singles title at the 2018 Internationaux de Tennis de Blois. He won the Dutch national singles title in December 2018.

He is the elder brother of tennis player Tallon Griekspoor and twin brother of Kevin Griekspoor.

Career finals

Singles (1 win)

External links
 
 

1991 births
Living people
Dutch male tennis players
Sportspeople from Haarlem
20th-century Dutch people
21st-century Dutch people